The 1905 City of Wellington by-election was a by-election in the New Zealand electorate of City of Wellington, a multi-member urban seat at the bottom of the North Island.

The by-election was held on 6 April 1905, and was precipitated by the death of sitting Liberal member of parliament George Fisher.

The by-election was won by Fisher's son Francis Fisher who stood as an Independent Liberal. Fisher beat Charles Izard and John Hutcheson. Izard would be successful in the  electorate in the  later in the year, and Hutcheson had previously represented the electorate.

Results
The following table gives the election results:

Notes

References 

Wellington 1905
1905 elections in New Zealand
Politics of the Wellington Region
1900s in Wellington